John Barrow may refer to:

Politics
 John Abarough (died 1540), Barow or Barrow, (died ), English politician
 Sir John Barrow, 1st Baronet (1764–1848), English statesman and writer
 John Henry Barrow (1817–1874), South Australian politician, journalist and minister
 John Barrow (American politician) (born 1955), former U.S. Representative from Georgia

Places
John Barrow (Little Rock), neighborhood of Little Rock, Arkansas, United States
John Barrow Island, one of the Queen Elizabeth Islands in the Canadian Arctic Archipelago

Other
 John Barrow (historian), English historian and mathematician
 John Barrow (Canadian football) (1935–2015), Canadian Football Hall of Fame member
 John Barrow (Canon of Windsor) (1651–1684), Canon of Windsor
 John Barrow (Catholic priest, born 1735) (1735–1811), Catholic priest towards the end of the penal times for English Catholics
 John Dodgson Barrow (1824–1907), American landscape painter
 John D. Barrow (1952–2020), British theoretical physicist and author

Barrow, John